Greg Morgan (born 6 February 1989) is a New Zealand former cricketer. He played four first-class and four List A matches for Auckland between 2007 and 2009.

See also
 List of Auckland representative cricketers

References

External links
 

1989 births
Living people
Auckland cricketers
Cricketers from East London, Eastern Cape
New Zealand cricketers